Figure skating at the 2016 Winter Youth Olympics took place at the Hamar Olympic Amphitheatre in Hamar, Norway from 12 to 21 February 2016.

Unique to the Youth Olympic Games was a mixed NOC team trophy competition.

Medal summary

Events

Medal table

Eligibility
Skaters were eligible to participate at the 2016 Winter Youth Olympics if they were born between 1 January 1999 and 31 December 2001, except males in pairs and ice dance, who may be born between 1 January 1997 and 31 December 2000.

Qualification system
The overall quota for the figure skating competition was 76 total skaters, consisting of 38 men and 38 ladies. There were 16 skaters in each of the single skating disciplines (men's and ladies'), 10 pair skating teams, and 12 ice dancing team. The maximum number of entries that qualified by a National Olympic Committee was 2 per event, making 12 (6 men, 6 ladies) the maximum number of entries that a country could qualify.

If a country placed a skater in the first, second or third position in a 2015 World Junior Figure Skating Championships discipline they qualified for two spots in that discipline at the Youth Olympics. All other nations could enter one athlete until a quota spot of twelve for each singles event, seven for pairs and nine for ice dancing, was reached. There were further four spots for each single event and three spots for pairs/ice dancing at the 2015–16 ISU Junior Grand Prix.

Number of entries per discipline 
Based on the results of the 2015 World Junior Championships and the 2015–16 ISU Junior Grand Prix series, the following countries have earned YOG quota places.

Notes  
1. Canada will send only one pair.
2. USA will send only one ice dance couple.
3. As the host, Norway has the right to one entry per discipline and has decided to enter one lady.
4. Did not use their YOG quota place.

Summary

Entries 
Some countries announced their selections in 2015, as early as October. The International Skating Union published a complete list of entries on 4 February 2016.

Time schedule 
Figure skating events will take place 13–16 February 2016.

Results

Men

Ladies

Pairs

Ice dancing

Mixed NOC team trophy

Teams

The skaters who took part the team trophy was determined by draw. The result of the draw was that none of the ladies' medalists, Polina Tsurskaya, Maria Sotskova and Elizabet Tursynbayeva, took part in this segment. It was the second consecutive time this had happened. At the 2012 Winter Youth Olympics none of the ladies' medalists, Elizaveta Tuktamysheva, Adelina Sotnikova and Li Zijun, took part in the team trophy either.

Results

Detailed results

Men

Ladies

Pairs

Ice dancing

References

External links 
 2016 Winter Olympics at the International Skating Union
 Figure skating at lillehammer2016.com
 Results Book – Figure skating

 
2016 in figure skating
International figure skating competitions hosted by Norway
2016
2016 Winter Youth Olympics events